The Diocese of The Arctic is a diocese of the Ecclesiastical Province of Rupert's Land of the Anglican Church of Canada. It is by far the largest of the thirty dioceses in Canada, comprising almost , or one-third the land mass of the country. As the name indicates, the diocese encompasses the Arctic region of Canada including the entirety of the Northwest Territories, Nunavut, and the Nunavik region of northern Quebec. The see city is Iqaluit, Nunavut, and the diocese's nearly 25,000 Anglicans (roughly 30% of the total population) are served by 46 parishes. The administrative offices of the diocese are located in Yellowknife, Northwest Territories.

The diocese is well known for its igloo-shaped cathedral, St. Jude's, which was destroyed by fire in 2005 but subsequently rebuilt and opened in 2012. It maintains a theological school, the Arthur Turner Training School in Iqaluit. In 1996, Paul Idlout became the first Inuk bishop in the world (as suffragan bishop).

History
Originally, the region was part of the vast and sprawling Diocese of Rupert's Land, which at the time encompassed all of present-day Canada west of Ontario. Anglican activity in the Far North primarily took the form of missionary work among the Aboriginal First Nations and Inuit, undertaken for the most part by the evangelical Church Mission Society. In 1874, the Diocese of Rupert's Land was split into four dioceses one of which, Athabasca, included the present-day Diocese of The Arctic. In 1892, Athabasca was subdivided to create the Diocese of Selkirk (coterminous with the Yukon) and the Diocese of Mackenzie River (coterminous with the Northwest Territories).

The Diocese of The Arctic was created from Athabasca in 1933, subsuming the Diocese of Mackenzie River and carving northern Quebec from the Diocese of Quebec, where—like Nunavut and the Northwest Territories—the majority of the population is indigenous. The first constituted synod was not convened, however, until 1972.

In 2002, Andrew Atagotaaluk became the first Inuk diocesan bishop in the world and the fifth bishop of The Arctic. Atagotaaluk retired at the end of 2012.

In June 2012, an electoral synod was held. David W. Parsons was elected to succeed as diocesan bishop and Darren McCartney as suffragan.

At the Diocesan Synod held in Yellowknife on 28 March 2019, Joey Royal, Annie Ittoshat and Lucy Netser were elected as suffragan bishops. They were consecrated on 31 March 2019 in Yellowknife, Northwest Territories.

Theology
Both the missionary history of the diocese and its particular cultural context contributes to its theology, which tends towards evangelicalism and conservatism.

Bishops David Parsons and Darren McCartney were the only Anglican Church of Canada bishops to attend GAFCON II, held in Nairobi, Kenya, from 21 to 26 October 2013.

On 18 July 2019, the Diocese of the Arctic declared itself in "impaired communion" with dioceses in the Anglican Church of Canada whose bishops have permitted same-sex marriages.

List of bishops of The Arctic

List of suffragan bishops

References

External links
 Diocesan website.
 William Carpenter Bompas.

Christian organizations established in 1933
Anglican Church of Canada dioceses
Culture of the Arctic
 
Anglican realignment dioceses
1933 establishments in Canada
Anglican Province of Rupert's Land